The Coudersport Area School District is a small rural, public school district which covers the Borough of Coudersport, the southern and western portions of Allegany Township, and all of Eulalia Township, Hebron Township, Homer Township, Summit Township and Sweden Township in Potter County, Pennsylvania. According to 2000 US Census Bureau data, the district served a resident population of 5,892. By 2010, the district's population declined to 5,692 people. The educational attainment levels for the school district population (25 years old and over) were 90.9% high school graduates and 23.9% college graduates. The district is one of the 500 public school districts of Pennsylvania and one of seven operating in Potter County.

According to the Pennsylvania Budget and Policy Center, 41.9% of the district's pupils lived at 185% or below the Federal Poverty level as shown by their eligibility for the federal free or reduced price school meal programs in 2012. In 2009, Coudersport Area School District residents' per capita income was $20,176 while, their median family income was $47,180. In the Commonwealth, the median family income was $49,501 and the United States median family income was $49,445, in 2010. In Potter County, the median household income was $39,198. By 2013, the median household income in the United States rose to $52,100.

Coudersport Area School District operates two schools: Coudersport Junior Senior High School (7th-12th) and Coudersport Elementary School (K-6th). High school students may choose to attend Seneca Highlands Career and Technical Center for training in the construction and mechanical trades. The Seneca Highlands Intermediate Unit IU9 provides Coudersport Area School District with a wide variety of services including specialized education for disabled students and hearing, speech and visual disability services as well as professional development for staff and faculty.

Extracurriculars
Coudersport Area School District offers a wide variety of clubs, activities and an extensive sports program.

Sports
The Coudersport Area School District funds:
Varsity

Boys
 Baseball - A
 Basketball - A
 Cross Country - A
 Football - A
 Golf - AA
 Soccer - A
 Track and Field - AA
 Wrestling - AA

Girls
 Basketball - A
 Cross Country - A
 Golf - AA
 Softball - A
 Track and Field - AA
 Volleyball - A

Junior High Middle School Sports

Boys
 Basketball
 Cross Country
 Football
 Track and Field
 Wrestling

Girls
 Basketball
 Cross Country
 Track and Field
 Volleyball

According to PIAA directory July 2014

References

External links
 Seneca Highlands Intermediate Unit 9

School districts in Potter County, Pennsylvania